Sman Ta Kron is a 1993 comedy film starring Tep Rundaro, Yuos Bovannak, Keo Koliyan, and Ampor Tevi.

Cast
Yuos Bovannak
Tep Rundaro
Keo Koliyan
Ampor Tevi

References

1993 films
Khmer-language films
Cambodian comedy films
1993 comedy films